Magical Date (まじかるで〜と Majikaru Dēto) is a skill game and dating sim published by Taito in 1996 for arcade and PlayStation. In this game, the player picks one of three possible girls to date and then starts off in a square as in a board game, proceeding to other squares which have different mini games. At junction points the player is asked questions about their date and has to pick the correct answer, or she will become upset.

Reception 
In Japan, Game Machine listed Magical Date on their February 1, 1997 issue as being the fourth most-successful arcade game of the month.

References

External links
Arcade Flyers

1996 video games
Arcade video games
Dating sims
Japan-exclusive video games
PlayStation (console) games
PlayStation Network games
Taito arcade games
Video games developed in Japan